Kirkland House is one of twelve undergraduate residential Houses at Harvard University, located near the Charles River in Cambridge, Massachusetts. It was named after John Thornton Kirkland, president of Harvard University from 1810 to 1828.

Background
Some of the buildings were built in 1914 but construction was not completed until 1933. Kirkland is one of the smallest Houses at Harvard, but has nevertheless managed to win many intramural and house-spirit contests, most recently the 2022 Straus Cup. Before Harvard opted to use a lottery system to assign housing to upperclassmen, Kirkland was considered the "jock house" because its location near Anderson Bridge and the Soldiers Field made it a desirable home and convenient place to dine for Harvard athletes.

The first Master of Kirkland House was Edward A. Whitney. Walter Eugene Clark succeeded Whitney as the second Master on September 1, 1935. The title of "House Master" was done away with at Harvard University in 2016 and was replaced with the title "Faculty Dean." The current Faculty Deans of Kirkland House are David Deming and Janine Santimauro, and the current Allston Burr Academic Dean is Jack Huguley, Ph.D.

Kirkland House boasts many traditions, such as its opening ceremony (complete with Minutemen reenactors playing the drums and fife as they process around the House, followed by the house Faculty Deans, tutors, and students), Secret Santa week (an in-house-only series of gifts, jokes, and events) -- accompanied by bawdy skits in the dining hall, and a Holiday Dinner and Dance complete with a mock roast boar.

Kirkland House has a gym, lounge, game room, meditation room, movie theater, music rooms, and performance and event spaces for students. It also has a wall honoring the history of the Kirkland House Boat Club, which has one of the most decorated records in all of Harvard house rowing. Most recently, head coach Christopher D.H. Row—a resident tutor, art history doctorate and master of divinity—led the KHBC to five consecutive Agassiz Cup victories (1999-2003) and was awarded by the KHBC the title of "Admiral-for-Life" in recognition of that accomplishment. Among the most recent additions is a brewery, operated and maintained by the Kirkland House Brew Club, which occupies the space once used as the house darkroom.

Kirkland House is located four blocks south of Harvard Yard, adjacent to Eliot House, and across Dunster Street from the Malkin Athletic Center.

The House Shield contains a black fess with three white stars on a red field. The stars are drawn from the arms of the many branches of the Kirkland family. The shield previously contained a cross on the arms of the Diocese of Carlisle (where the name Kirkland originated), but due to the shield's perceived resemblance to the Confederate battle flag, a modified design was officially approved by the University and adopted on March 6, 2020.

Constituent halls

Kirkland House comprises the following three halls:

 Smith Halls
 Bryan Hall
 Faculty Deans' Residence
 Hicks House
 20 Prescott Street apartments

Smith Halls, which were constructed in 1914 as freshman dormitories; Bryant Hall and the Masters' Residence, both constructed in 1931; and Hicks House, which dates from 1762 and serves as the House Library. Kirkland students also live in the Prescott Street apartments. Located in Smith Halls, the dining hall and Junior Common Room boast magnificent woodwork and high ceilings that highlight Kirkland's classic charm and elegance.

Notable alumni

References

External links

 Kirkland House official site

Harvard Houses
University and college dormitories in the United States